This is a list of Mexico national football team's all kinds of competitive records.

Individual records

Player records

Players in bold are still active with Mexico.

Most capped players

Top goalscorers

Competition records
For the all-time record of the national team against opposing nations, see the team's all-time record page.

FIFA World Cup

CONCACAF Gold Cup

CONCACAF Nations League

Copa América

FIFA Confederations Cup

Olympic Games

Head-to-head record 
The list shown below shows the Mexico national football team's all-time international record against opposing nations. The statistics are composed of FIFA World Cup, FIFA World Cup Qualifying, FIFA Confederations Cup,  CONCACAF Gold Cup (including CONCACAF Championship), CONCACAF Cup, Summer Olympics, Copa America, and CONCACAF Nations League matches, as well as international friendly matches.

After the match against  on 30 November 2022.

Record against former nations

Penalty shootouts

Notes

References

Mexico national football team
National association football team records and statistics